Carlyle Mansions is a block of flats located on Cheyne Walk, in the Chelsea area of London, England. Built in 1886, it was named after Thomas Carlyle, himself a resident of Chelsea for much of his life.

Carlyle Mansions is nicknamed the "Writers’ Block", as it has been home to Henry James, Erskine Childers, T. S. Eliot, Somerset Maugham, Ian Fleming and other noted authors.

Notable residents
No. 1:  Richard Addinsell, English composer
No. 6: Thomas Hare, English political reformer
No. 11: Gordon Harker, English actor
 also Edward Robey, lawyer in the Acid Bath Murders case of the serial killer John George Haigh
No. 12a: Melton Prior, English illustrator and war correspondent
No. 19: T. S. Eliot, American poet and writer
 also the literary critic John Davy Hayward
No. 20: Robert Erskine Childers, Irish nationalist and novelist, author of The Riddle of the Sands
No. 21: Henry James, American novelist
No. 24: Ian Fleming, novelist, creator of James Bond
 also Sol Campbell, England and Arsenal football player
No. 27: W. Somerset Maugham, British novelist
 Lionel Davidson, British novelist

References

External links 
 Carlyle Mansions, Chesterton Humberts, by Melanie Backe-Hansen

Apartment buildings in London
Buildings and structures in the Royal Borough of Kensington and Chelsea